Ornithodoros kelleyi  is an argasid tick parasite of bats found widely throughout North America in caves and other natural and man-made features that harbor bats. The species has not been shown to be a major vector of pathogens.

References

Ticks
Arachnids of North America
Animals described in 1941